Decatur Downtown Historic District may refer to the following places:
Decatur Downtown Historic District (Decatur, Georgia), listed on the National Register of Historic Places
Decatur Downtown Historic District (Decatur, Illinois), listed on the National Register of Historic Places